1954–55 was the forty-second occasion on which the Lancashire Cup competition had been held.
This year, the first time for many years save a new name on the trophy. Barrow changed codes to rugby league in 1897, were promoted into the league for season 1900–01 and have taken part in every one of the Lancashire Cup competitions since their inception in 1905, and now finally, almost 50 years later, they won the trophy by beating Oldham in the final by the score of 12-2.
The match was played at Station Road, Pendlebury (historically in the county of Lancashire). The attendance was 25,204 and receipts were £4,603.

Background 

This year saw the entry on new league members Blackpool Borough, and this together with the invitation to juniors, Lancashire Amateurs brought the total number of clubs to a full complement of 16.
For the first time in the competition, there was no need to have any byes or “blank/dummy” fixtures.
The same pre-war fixture format was retained, but, as mentioned, for the first time without any bye or dummy” fixtures.
And for the first time since the outbreak of war in 1939, the two-legged fixtures were abolished, resulting in the competition being played on a knock-out basis.

Competition and results

Round 1 
Involved  8 matches (with no bye or “blank” fixture) and 16 clubs

Round 2 - quarterfinals 
Involved 4 matches (with no bye) and 8 clubs

Round 3 – semifinals  
Involved 2 matches and 4 clubs

Final

Teams and scorers

Scoring - Try = three (3) points - Goal = two (2) points - Drop goal = two (2) points

The road to success

Notes and comments 
1 * This season saw, for the first time ever, a full 16 clubs taking part and also a return to a knock-out tournament in ll rounds. 
2 * The first Lancashire Cup match played by the new club Blackpool Borough  and on this, their first ground 
3 * Lancashire Amateurs were a junior (or amateur) club from Lancashire 
4 * The last game played by this founding club. At the end of the season they folded 
5 * Station Road was the home ground of Swinton from 1929 to 1932 and at its peak was one of the finest rugby league grounds in the country and it boasted a capacity of 60,000. The actual record attendance was for the Challenge Cup semi-final on 7 April 1951 when 44,621 watched Wigan beat Warrington 3-2

See also 
1954–55 Northern Rugby Football League season
Rugby league county cups

References

External links
Saints Heritage Society
1896–97 Northern Rugby Football Union season at wigan.rlfans.com
Hull&Proud Fixtures & Results 1896/1897
Widnes Vikings - One team, one passion Season In Review - 1896-97
The Northern Union at warringtonwolves.org

1954 in English rugby league
RFL Lancashire Cup